Iran Weightlifting Federation (IRIWF) is the governing body for weightlifting in Iran. It aims to govern, encourage and develop the sport for all throughout the country.

History
IRIWF has been established in 1939. First president of the IRIWF was Amannollah Padgorni. IRIWF is a member of the International Weightlifting Federation (IWF) and also Asian Weightlifting Federation (AWF).

The federation organizes the national weightlifting events, and Asian and World championships hosted by Iran.

The Committees 
There are many committees in I.R.I.W.F. structure such as:

 Referees Committee: Mohsen jalili
 Coaches Committee: Mohsen Davoodi
 Talent Committee: Omid Rezayani
 Education Committee: Dr. Mostafa Hekmatpour
 Disciplinary Committee:

International achievements

Olympics

World Championships

Asian Games

Notable weightlifters
Men
 Hossein Rezazadeh,  twice Olympic four-times World  and twice Asian Games Champion. 
 Mohammad Nasiri, triple Olympic Medalist (1 Gold. 1 Silver and 1 Bronze) five-times World and three-times Asian Games Champion.
 Behdad Salimi, Olympic Champion, two-times World Champion and also triple Asian Games Champion.
 Kianoush Rostami, Olympic Champion and Olympic silver Medalist and also two-times World Champion. 
 Hossein Tavakoli, Olympic Champion.
 Sohrab Moradi, Olympic Champion. World Champion and Asian Games Champion.
 Mahmoud Namjoo, twice Olympic Medalist ( 1 Silver, 1 Bronze ), tree-times World Champion and Also Asian Games Champion.
 Parviz Jalayer, Olympic Silver Medalist and Asian Games Champion.
 Shahin Nasirinia, World and Asian Games Champion.
 Nasrollah Dehnavi, Asian Games Champion and World Bronze Medalist.

External links
 I.R Iran Weightlifting Federation

IRAN
Federation
Weightlifting
Organisations based in Tehran
Sports organizations established in 1939
1939 establishments in Iran